Luis Elizondo is a media personality and former U.S. Army Counterintelligence Special Agent and former employee of the Office of the Under Secretary of Defense for Intelligence. Later, Elizondo was the Director of Global Security and Special Programs for To the Stars, through which he starred in the History Channel television series Unidentified: Inside America's UFO Investigation.

Elizondo has claimed to be the former director of the now defunct Advanced Aerospace Threat Identification Program, a program associated with the Pentagon UFO videos. Elizondo has subsequently appeared in various media as a UFO expert, but critics question his credibility and credulity.

Early history

Elizondo is the son of Luis Elizondo III, a Cuban exile who volunteered for Brigade 2506, a CIA-sponsored group of exiles formed in 1960 to attempt the military overthrow of the Cuban government headed by Fidel Castro, which culminated in the Bay of Pigs invasion.
Elizondo was born in Miami and graduated from Riverview High School in Sarasota in 1990, where he was a member of the ROTC program.

In college Elizondo studied microbiology, immunology, and parasitology. He later served in the U.S. Army for 20 years, during which he ran military intelligence operations in Afghanistan, South America, and Guantanamo Bay's Camp Seven. Regarding his military career, Elizondo stated he "dealt with a lot of stuff, like coup d'états, black market terrorism, violent drug cartels, all that kind of stuff".

Career

Office of the Under Secretary of Defense for Intelligence
From 2008 until his resignation in 2017, Elizondo claimed to work with the Office of the Under Secretary of Defense for Intelligence in The Pentagon. Elizondo claims that ending in 2012, he was the director of the Advanced Aerospace Threat Identification Program, a special access program funded at the initiative of the then Senate majority leader, Harry Reid (D-Nevada) to investigate aerial threats including unidentified aerial phenomena. Elizondo told a reporter he thought that he might have been selected for AATIP because of his scientific background, work as a counterintelligence agent protecting American aerospace technology, and lack of interest in science fiction.

According to the Department of Defense, the AATIP program ended in 2012 after five years. Elizondo claims he worked with officials from the U.S. Navy and the CIA out of his Pentagon office for this program until October 2017, when he resigned to protest what he characterized as "excessive secrecy and internal opposition". Elizondo asserts that "underestimating or ignoring these potential threats is not in the best interest of the Department no matter the level of political contention." The New Yorker reports that Elizondo was hired to take over the program, which was an outgrowth of a government project awarded to businessman and paranormal enthusiast Robert Bigelow, ostensibly to examine the future of warfare, but reporting almost exclusively about U.F.O.s, including "a photo of a supposed tracking device that supposed aliens had supposedly implanted in a supposed abductee".

His position in the AATIP was questioned by The Intercept and challenged by Pentagon officials, with spokesperson Christopher Sherwood saying "Mr. Elizondo had no responsibilities with regard to the AATIP program while he worked in OUSDI [the Office of Under Secretary of Defense for Intelligence], up until the time he resigned effective 10/4/2017." In response, Elizondo filed a complaint with the agency's inspector general claiming "a coordinated campaign to discredit him for speaking out" including "Pentagon press statements asserting he had no official role in UFO research, even after his role was officially confirmed". In the inspector general's complaint, Elizondo also stated that he was the target of "a personal vendetta from a Pentagon rival".  Senator Reid sent a letter to NBC News stating "I can state as a matter of record Lue Elizondo's involvement and leadership role in this program".

To The Stars
After resigning from DOD, Elizondo in October 2017 joined To the Stars Academy of Arts and Sciences. Elizondo also distributed three declassified videos to the press that were made by pilots from the United States Navy aircraft carriers USS Nimitz and USS Theodore Roosevelt which became known as the Pentagon UFO videos. The release was accompanied by the first mainstream press reporting on the existence of the AATIP. In April 2019, the Navy acknowledged drafting new guidelines for pilots and other personnel to report encounters with "unidentified aircraft", and Elizondo told The Washington Post that it was "the single greatest decision the Navy has made in decades". The classified nature of the videos and the validity of Elizondo's authorization to distribute them were questioned. In April 2020, the United States Department of Defense released the videos prompting Elizondo to comment, "We are fueled by the Pentagon's significant actions and hope this encourages a new wave of credible information to come forward". According to Gideon Lewis-Kraus, Elizondo initially explained to the Pentagon in a memo that the videos would "help educate pilots and improve aviation safety", but in later interviews he stated that his goal was to shine light on the program he ran for seven-years to "collect and analyze reported UFO sightings". After joining To the Stars, Elizondo announced they were, "'planning to provide never-before-released footage from real U.S. government systems—not blurry amateur photos but real data and real videos'". Elizondo believes UAPs might be from another dimension, they might use hydrogen found in water to "warp space time", and the US government may be in possession of "exotic material" associated with UAPs.

A History Channel docuseries titled Unidentified: Inside America's UFO Investigation produced by To the Stars features Elizondo and others who claim affiliation with AATIP.

Elizondo, along with Christopher Mellon and Steve Justice, left To the Stars in late 2020, saying "Tom [De Longe] is really focused on the entertainment side, so there's not a whole lot for Chris, Steve and I to do [...] Our talents lie in engaging governments, Congress and international organizations, and we're ready to shift into second gear. Entertainment is one way to do it, but it's not comprehensive."

Criticism 
Writing in The New Republic, Jason Colavito questioned why if Elizondo was so concerned that UFOs "were an imminent national security threat, he didn't take his concerns to national security journalists or to Congress".

According to The Intercept writer Keith Kloor, "Elizondo and Mellon have come to rely on a largely passive and credulous press to generate sensational UFO headlines". Kloor notes that Elizondo received considerable media attention from a 2017 New York Times story titled "Glowing Auras and 'Black Money': The Pentagon's Mysterious UFO Program", and gained visibility by starring in the History Channel TV series. Air & Space magazine wrote that the TV series "cast Elizondo as a burly, intrepid, backpack-toting crusader seeking to expose the truth in the face of a stonewalling government bureaucracy and a culture of ridicule. In doing so, the History Channel followed a long tradition within ufology of portraying the UFO investigator as a heroic figure determined to tear away the veil of secrecy surrounding extraterrestrial visitors".

New York Times Pentagon correspondent Helene Cooper interviewed Elizondo in 2017. Cooper characterized Elizondo's behavior as typical of intelligence officers, who are "really spooky guys, they're very secretive, they tend to be more paranoid". According to Cooper, "There was a lot of looking over to make sure nobody was seeing us, he sat with his back to the wall. He said, because he wanted to see if anybody came in". Cooper explained to "The Daily" podcast host Michael Barbaro that at the time she spoke to Elizondo, she found him credible, but when she got on the metro after the meeting she began to have second thoughts, saying "the farther away I got from the interview the less believable it seemed".

Writing in The New Yorker in 2021, Gideon Lewis-Kraus reported that after talking with Elizondo, it was difficult to determine what AATIP had accomplished, and when pressed, Elizondo "invokes his security oath like a catchphrase". When in 2019 Elizondo was interviewed by Tucker Carlson, Elizondo suggested that the government had fragments of a UFO, "then quickly invoked his security oath".

See also
 Unidentified Aerial Phenomena Task Force

References

External links
 
 Elizondo and others featured on '60 Minutes' - May 2021

Living people
People of the Defense Intelligence Agency
Ufologists
Year of birth missing (living people)